Scrobipalpa ahasver is a moth in the family Gelechiidae. It was described by Povolný in 1969. It is found in Mongolia.

References

Scrobipalpa
Moths described in 1969
Taxa named by Dalibor Povolný